A scout cruiser was a type of warship of the early 20th century, which were smaller, faster, more lightly armed and armoured than protected cruisers or light cruisers, but larger than contemporary destroyers. Intended for fleet scouting duties and acting as a flotilla leader, a scout cruiser was typically armed with six to ten destroyer-type guns of 3-inch (76 mm) to 4.7-inch (120 mm) calibre, plus two to four torpedo tubes.

The British were the first to operate scout cruisers, when the Royal Navy acquired 15 ships divided into two distinct groups - the eight vessels all ordered under the 1903 Programme, and the seven later, heavier-armed vessels ordered under the 1907–1910 Programmes. All these ships served in World War I, when the advent of better machinery and larger, faster destroyers and light cruisers had already made them obsolete.

The other major operator of scout cruisers was the Kingdom of Italy. With no conventional protected cruisers or light cruisers planned between 1900 and 1928, the Italian Royal Navy instead operated a number of scout cruisers (esploratori) from 1912 onwards. Ranging in size from enlarged destroyers to substantial, light cruiser-like ships, these esploratori were also given secondary capabilities as fast minelayers. However, by 1938 the surviving esploratori were re-rated as destroyers.

Scout cruiser designs

Austro-Hungarian Navy

Brazilian Navy

Peruvian Navy

Regia Marina 
Note: this list includes all vessels rated as scouts (esploratori) by Italy.
  – protected cruisers, rated as esploratori from 1914 to 1921
 
 
 Alessandro Poerio class - included 
 
 
 
  - originally classified esploratori oceanici (ocean scouts), then re-rated light cruisers

Romanian Navy

Royal Navy

United States Navy 

  – later re-classified as light cruisers (CL)
 The first three  ships were also designated "scout cruisers" (CS) when ordered, but in 1920, before any were launched, the Navy revised its classification system and they - and the Chesters - became light cruisers (CL).

See also 
 Destroyer leader
 Flotilla leader

Ship types
Cruisers